Democratic Party most often refers to:
Democratic Party (United States)

Democratic Party and similar terms may also refer to:

Active parties

Africa
Botswana Democratic Party
Democratic Party of Equatorial Guinea
Gabonese Democratic Party
Democratic Party of Guinea – African Democratic Rally
Democratic Party of Ivory Coast – African Democratic Rally
Democratic Party (Kenya)
Basotho Batho Democratic Party, Lesotho
Democratic Party (Libya)
Malawi Democratic Party
Democratic Party of Namibia
Senegalese Democratic Party
Seychelles Democratic Party
Democratic Alliance (South Africa)
Swazi Democratic Party
Democratic Party (Tanzania)
Democratic Party (Tunisia)
Democratic Party (Uganda)

Americas
Democratic Progressive Party (Argentina)
National Democratic Party (Argentina)
Democratic Party (Mendoza), Argentina
Democratic Party of the City of Buenos Aires, Argentina
Anguilla Democratic Party
Bonaire Democratic Party
Democrats (Brazil)
Brazilian Democratic Movement Party
New Democratic Party, Canada
Party for Democracy (Chile)
Democratic Party (Curaçao)
Christian Democratic Party (El Salvador)
Social Democratic Party (El Salvador)
Guyana Democratic Party
Montserrat Democratic Party
Democratic Party (Sint Eustatius)
Democratic Party Sint Maarten
Peruvian Democratic Party
Democratic Party We Are Peru
Democratic Party (Puerto Rico)
Democratic Party of Trinidad and Tobago
Democratic Party of the Virgin Islands, U.S. Virgin Islands

Asia
Khmer Democratic Party, Cambodia
Democratic Party (East Timor)
Democratic Party (Hong Kong)
Meghalaya Democratic Party, India
Nagaland Democratic Party, India
Reang Democratic Party, India
Democratic Party (Indonesia)
Indonesian Democratic Party of Struggle
Bet-Nahrain Democratic Party, Iraq
Democratic Party Adilet, Kazakhstan
Lebanese Democratic Party
Arab Democratic Party (Lebanon)
Kurdish Democratic Party (Lebanon)
Maldivian Democratic Party
Democratic Party (Mongolia)
Democratic Party (Myanmar)
Korean Social Democratic Party, North Korea
Pakistan Democratic Party
Centrist Democratic Party of the Philippines
Democratic Party of the Philippines
Philippine Democratic Party – People's Power, better known as PDP–Laban
Singapore Democratic Party
Singapore Democratic Alliance
People's Liberal Democratic Party, Singapore
Democratic Party of Korea, South Korea
Democratic Party (Sri Lanka)
Democratic Progressive Party, Taiwan
Democratic Party (Tajikistan)
Democrat Party (Thailand)
Democratic Party of Turkmenistan

Europe
European Democratic Party
Europeans United for Democracy
Democratic Party of Albania
Democratic Party (Andorra)
Democrats for Andorra
Democratic Party of Armenia
Azerbaijan Democratic Party
Serb Democratic Party (Bosnia and Herzegovina)
Democratic Party of Republika Srpska, Bosnia and Herzegovina
Bulgarian Democratic Party
Democratic Party (Bulgaria)
Democratic Party of Zagorje, Croatia
Democratic Party (Cyprus)
Democratic Party (Denmark)
Democratic Party of Germany
Democrats (Greenland)
Iceland Democratic Party
Democratic Party (Italy)
Democratic Party of Kosovo
Democratic Party (Luxembourg)
Democratic Party of Turks, Macedonia
Democratic Party (Malta)
Democratic Party of Moldova
Democratic Party (Montenegro)
Democratic Party of Artsakh, Nagorno-Karabakh
Democrats 66, Netherlands
Democrats in Norway
Democratic Party – demokraci.pl, Poland
Alliance of Democrats (Poland)
Democratic Party (Serbia)
Democratic Party of Serbia
Democratic Party of Slovenia
Slovenian Democratic Party
Catalan European Democratic Party, Spain
Sweden Democrats
Swiss Democrats
Democrat Party (Turkey, current)
Democratic Party of Ukraine

Oceania
Australian Democrats
Democratic Party (Cook Islands)
Democratic Party of Guam
Democratic Party of Nauru
Democratic Party (Northern Mariana Islands)
Democratic Party (Solomon Islands)

Defunct parties

Africa
Dahomeyan Democratic Party, Benin
Democratic Party of Benin
Democratic Party (Gambia)
Sudanese Democratic Party, French Sudan
Ipelegeng Democratic Party, Seoposengwe Party, Namibia
Namibia Democratic Party
Democratic Party of Nigeria and the Cameroons
Democratic Party (South Africa)
Democratic Party (South Africa, 1973)

Americas
Democratic Party (Brazil, 1925-1934)
Democratic Party (Chile)
Democratic Party (Costa Rica)
Democratic Party (Cuba)
Democratic Party (Nicaragua)
Democratic Party (Peru)
Democratic Action Congress, Trinidad and Tobago
Democratic National Assembly, Trinidad and Tobago
Caribbean People's Democratic Party, Trinidad and Tobago
Social Democratic Labour Party of Trinidad and Tobago
Venezuelan Democratic Party

Asia
Democratic Party (Cambodia)
Democratic Party (1912), China
Democratic Parties, the official term for the eight small non-Communist parties in China that exist alongside the Communist Party
Indonesian Democratic Party
Democratic Party (Japan, 1947)
Democratic Party (Japan, 1954)
Democratic Party (Japan, 1996)
Democratic Party of Japan
Democratic Party (Japan, 2016)
Democratic Party (Laos)
Malaysian Democratic Party
Democratic Party (Philippines), 1950s
Democrata Party, Philippines, early 20th century
Democratic Party (Singapore)
Korea Democratic Party, South Korea (1945–1949)
Democratic Party (South Korea, 1955)
New Democratic Party (South Korea)
Reunification Democratic Party, South Korea (1987-1990)
Democratic Party (South Korea, 1990)
Democratic Party (South Korea, 1991)
Democratic Party (South Korea, 1995)
United Democratic Party (South Korea, 1995)
Democratic Party (South Korea, 2000)
Democratic Party (South Korea, 2005)
Democratic Party (South Korea, 2007)
Democratic Party (South Korea, 2008)
Democratic Party (South Korea, 2011)
Democratic Party of Vietnam

Europe
European Democrats
Democratic Party of Abkhazia
Democratic Abkhazia
Democratic Party of Austria
The Democrats (Austria)
Azerbaijani Democratic Party
Democratic Party (Central Lithuania)
Estonian Democratic Party
German Democratic Party
Democratic Party for a British Gibraltar
Democratic Party (Hungary)
Democratic Party (Italy, 1913)
Italian Democratic Party
The Democrats (Italy)
Democratic Party of South Tyrol, Italy
Democratic Party (Macedonia)
Democratic Party of Macedonia
Democratic Party (Portugal), 1912–1926
Democratic Party of the Atlantic, Portugal
Democratic Party (Romania)
Democratic Party of Russia
Party of Democrats, San Marino
Democratic Party (Slovakia, 1944)
Democratic Party (Slovakia, 1989)
Democratic Party (Spain)
Democratic Party (Switzerland)
Democrat Party (Turkey, 1946–61) 
Democratic Party (UK, 1942)
Democratic Party (UK, 1969)
British Democratic Party (1979–1982)
British Democratic Party (2013–present)
Democratic Party (UK, 1998)
Democratic Party (Yugoslavia)

Oceania
Democratic Party (1920), Australia
Democratic Party (1943), Australia
Fiji Democratic Party
Democratic Party (Solomon Islands, historical)

See also
 Democrat (disambiguation)
 Democracy Party (disambiguation)
 Democratic Movement (disambiguation)
 Democrat Party (disambiguation)
 Minjudang (disambiguation)